Paperino is a village in Tuscany, central Italy, administratively a frazione of the comune of Prato, province of Prato. It is located about 6 km from the centre of Prato and 22 km from Florence.

The 1981 comedy film West of Paperino is named after this village.

References

Bibliography
 

Frazioni of the Province of Prato